Sultan Adi Korklu Bey (Pronounced 'Raisin Adee Bay') was the first Ruler of the Elisu Sultanate and a Sunni Muslim and reigned over the Tsakhurs. He was a relative and Vassal of Ottoman Suleiman the Magnificent, and was awarded the title Sultan by Suleiman against the Safavid Dynasty.

Ilisu
Sultans